Rocktoberfest is an annual event held by the Red River Gorge Climbers' Coalition located in the Red River Gorge.  This event is a place for climbers to come together to share their enthusiasm for rock climbing and celebrate the ownership of the Pendergrass-Murray Recreation Preserve, which was finally purchased in 2012 by the RRGCC. It is held in October, hence the name "Rocktoberfest".  It typically lasts three days, during which many events are held that include exclusive films, climbing clinics, live music, and various competitions. Rocktoberfest 2013 took place from October 11–13 in the Red River Gorge.

Events
Clinics held for climbers to hone their skills and learn from professionals
Yoga sessions in the morning for climbers
The Reel Rock Tour is Saturday night
Bouldering and roped climbing competitions are held
Food is provided as well and parties at night

References

External links
 

Climbing organizations